Milichia is a genus of flies belonging to the family Milichiidae.

The genus has cosmopolitan distribution.

Species

Species:
Milichia aethiops Malloch, 1913
Milichia albomaculata (Strobl, 1900)
Milichia angustifrons Bezzi, 1928

References

Milichiidae
Brachycera genera